Campo Arañuelo is a comarca in Cáceres, Extremadura, Spain.  It contains the municipalities of Almaraz, Belvís de Monroy, Berrocalejo, Bohonal de Ibor, Casas de Miravete, Casatejada, El Gordo, Higuera de Albalat, Majadas, Mesas de Ibor, Millanes, Navalmoral de la Mata, Peraleda de la Mata, Romangordo, Rosalejo, Saucedilla, Serrejón, Talayuela, Tiétar, Toril, Valdecañas de Tajo, Valdehúncar. Notable for the Dolmen de Guadalperal, the "Spanish Stonehenge".

Sources 
 La Gaceta del Arañuelo - Las noticias del Campo Arañuelo
 Web oficial de la comarca del Campo Arañuelo
 Web oficial de la Mancomunidad de Municipios del Campo Arañuelo
 Noticias del Campo Arañuelo en NavalmoralDigital.com

References

Comarcas of Extremadura
Province of Cáceres